The 1993–94 UEFA Champions League preliminary round was the qualifying round for the 1993–94 UEFA Champions League, and featured 20 teams. It began on 18 August with the first legs and ended on 1 September 1993 with the second legs. The ten winners advanced to the first round, joining 22 other teams.

Times are CEST (UTC+2), as listed by UEFA.

Format
Each tie was played over two legs, with each team playing one leg at home. The team that scored more goals on aggregate over the two legs advanced to the next round. If the aggregate score was level, the away goals rule was applied, i.e. the team that scored more goals away from home over the two legs advanced. If away goals were also equal, then extra time was played. The away goals rule would be again applied after extra time, i.e. if there were goals scored during extra time and the aggregate score was still level, the visiting team advanced by virtue of more away goals scored. If no goals were scored during extra time, the tie was decided by penalty shoot-out.

Draw
The draw for the preliminary round was held on 14 July 1993 in Geneva, Switzerland.

Summary

The first legs were played on 18 and 22 August, and the second legs on 1 September 1993.

|}

Matches

HJK won 2–1 on aggregate.

Floriana won 2–0 on aggregate.

Croatia Zagreb won 11–0 on aggregate.

1–1 on aggregate. Skonto won 11–10 on penalties.

4–4 on aggregate. Cork City won on away goals.

Dinamo Tbilisi originally won 3–2 on aggregate, but were banned from the competition. Linfield won on walkover.

Rosenborg won 3–0 on aggregate.

ÍA won 3–0 on aggregate.

Aarau won 3–2 on aggregate.

Beitar Jerusalem won 3–1 on aggregate.

Notes

References

External links

Preliminary round
UEFA Champions League qualifying rounds
August 1993 sports events in Europe
September 1993 sports events in Europe